Theme for a Trucker is a limited edition double 7" vinyl EP by alternative country band Whiskeytown, released by Bloodshot Records in 1997.  According to the Bloodshot Records website, only 2000 copies were pressed.

Music and lyrics
The song "Theme for a Trucker" was written by Ryan Adams as a tribute to his friend Jere McIlwean, who had recently died from a heroin overdose.  McIlwean (who had also been a bandmate of Adams in his pre-Whiskeytown days) was in a band named Trucker; hence the title of the song.  Said Adams of McIlwean: "He’d hate that song so bad; he hated country. Well, he didn’t hate country music, but he didn’t like my version of it, anyway.”

According to a 1997 article in No Depression magazine, Whiskeytown's cover of the True Believers' "The Rain Won't Help You When It's Over" almost made it onto this release.  The song's inclusion was even lobbied for by its composer, Alejandro Escovedo.

Track listing

Personnel and production credits
 Ryan Adams —  guitar, vocals
 Caitlin Cary —  violin, vocals
 Phil Wandscher —  guitar
 Bill Ladd — pedal steel
 Steve Terry — drums
 Chris Stamey —  bass, piano, percussion, producer, mixing, assistant engineer
 Tim Harper — recording, mixing
 Greg Elkins — assistant engineer
 Larry Nix — mastering
 Mixed at Modern Recording Service, Chapel Hill, NC, January 1997
 Mastered at Ardent Studios, Memphis, TN

References

Whiskeytown EPs
1997 EPs
Bloodshot Records albums